Gangaikondan was a state assembly constituency in Tamil Nadu. It was in existence from 1962 to 1971 state elections.

Members of Legislative Assembly

Election results

1971

1967

1962

References 

 

Former assembly constituencies of Tamil Nadu